Frank S. Bauer (July 9, 1856 – August 16, 1936) was an American businessman, farmer, and politician.

Bauer was born on a farm in Leroy, Wisconsin. He owned a general store in Knowles, Wisconsin and served as postmaster. Bauer served in the Wisconsin Assembly from 1905 to 1909 and was a Democrat. In 1913, Bauer moved to a farm in Biron, Wisconsin. He served on the Biron Trustee Board and also served as the Biron Village President. Bauer also served on the school board and was the school board clerk. Bauer died at his home in Biron, Wisconsin after suffering a heart attack.

Notes

External links

1856 births
1936 deaths
People from LeRoy, Wisconsin
People from Wood County, Wisconsin
Businesspeople from Wisconsin
Farmers from Wisconsin
Wisconsin postmasters
School board members in Wisconsin
Mayors of places in Wisconsin
Wisconsin city council members
People from Dodge County, Wisconsin
Democratic Party members of the Wisconsin State Assembly